, also known as , was the son of Oda Nobuhide and younger brother of Oda Nobunaga, who lived during the Sengoku period of Japan.

Nobuyuki conspired against his brother Nobunaga with the Hayashi clan (Owari), which Nobunaga viewed as treason. Nobuyuki's Suemori Castle was reduced by Ikeda Nobuteru. Nobuyuki was pardoned, however in 1558 it was discovered that he had been planning yet another revolt and Nobuyuki was executed.

Family
Father: Oda Nobuhide (1510–1551)
Mother: Tsuchida Gozen (died 1594)
Brothers
Oda Nobuhiro (died 1574)
Oda Nobunaga (1534–1582)
Oda Nagamasu (1548–1622)
Oda Nobukane (1548–1614)
Oda Nobuharu (1549–1570)
Oda Nobutoki (died 1556)
Oda Nobuoki 
Oda Hidetaka 
Oda Hidenari
Oda Nobuteru
Oda Nagatoshi
Sisters:
Oichi (1547–1583)
Oinu
Sons: 
 Tsuda Nobuzumi (1555–1583)
 Tsuda Nobutada (:Ja:津田 信糺) (1555-1633)
  Oda Nobukane (:Ja:織田信兼) (d.1583) Not to be confused with Oda Nobukane 織田信包

References

1536 births
1557 deaths
Samurai
Oda clan